Luca Boltshauser (born July 17, 1993) is a Swiss professional ice hockey goaltender who currently plays for SCL Tigers in the National League (NL).

Playing career
Boltshauser was originally part of the ZSC Lions organization as a junior before signing in the Swedish Hockey League with Färjestads BK. Boltshauser played in the J20 SuperElit competition for Färjestads, however never made his SHL debut. He was loaned to HockeyAllsvenskan club, VIK Västerås HK, before returning to the ZSC Lions for the 2014–15 season.

On February 3, 2015, it was confirmed that Boltshauser would join his second NLA club, the Kloten Flyers, on a one-year deal.

Following a year in which Kloten were relegated to the Swiss League, Boltshauser joined Lausanne HC on a two-year contract starting in the 2018–19 season.

References

External links

1993 births
Living people
GCK Lions players
EHC Kloten players
Lausanne HC players
SCL Tigers players
Swiss ice hockey goaltenders
VIK Västerås HK players
ZSC Lions players
Ice hockey people from Zürich